The Best Of: Volume 1 is the first compilation album by Australian alternative rock band Silverchair, which was issued on 13 November 2000. It includes every single they had released up until that point, with the exception of "Shade". The album peaked at No. 15 on the ARIA Albums Chart.

In March 1999, after the release of Neon Ballroom, Silverchair's three-album contract with Murmur and Sony Music had ended. After leaving the label, Sony issued The Best Of: Volume 1 without the band's consent. Late in November 2000, Johns disavowed the compilation: "We thought about putting out ads in the street press to make people aware that we weren't endorsing it, but that would have blown the whole thing out of proportion ... If people want to buy it, they can buy it but I wouldn't buy it if I was a Silverchair fan."

The second disc from the limited edition was later released in December 2002 as Rarities 1994–1999, an entirely new product with its own artwork.

Track listing
Disc one A-Sides

"Anthem for the Year 2000" (Remix)
"Freak" (Freak Show)
"Ana's Song (Open Fire)" (Neon Ballroom)
"Emotion Sickness" (Neon Ballroom)
"Israel's Son" (Frogstomp)
"Tomorrow" (Frogstomp)
"Cemetery" (Freak Show)
"The Door" (Freak Show)
"Miss You Love" (Neon Ballroom)
"Abuse Me" (Freak Show)
"Pure Massacre" (Frogstomp)

Disc two B-Sides
 "Untitled"
 "New Race" (Radio Birdman cover)
 "Trash"
 "Ana's Song" (Acoustic Remix)
 "Madman" (Vocal Mix)
 "Blind"
 "Punk Song #2"
 "Wasted/Fix Me" (Black Flag cover)
 "Minor Threat" (Minor Threat cover)
 "Freak" (Remix)
 "Spawn (Pre-Vitro)"

Australian cassette MATTC109

Side one
 "Anthem for the Year 2000"
 "Freak"
 "Ana's Song"
 "Emotion Sickness"
 "Israel's Son"
 "Untitled"
 "New Race"
 "Trash"
 "Ana's Song" (Acoustic Remix)
 "Madman" (Vocal Mix)

Side two
 "Tomorrow"
 "Cemetery"
 "The Door"
 "Miss You Love"
 "Abuse Me"
 "Pure Massacre"
 "Blind"
 "Punk Song #2"
 "Wasted/Fix Me"
 "Minor Threat"
 "Freak" (Remix)
 "Spawn (Pre-Vitro)"

Original single disc version
"Anthem for the Year 2000" (Remix)
"Freak"
"Ana's Song (Open Fire)"
"Emotion Sickness"
"Israel's Son"
"Tomorrow"
"Cemetery"
"The Door"
"Miss You Love"
"Abuse Me"
"Pure Massacre"
"Untitled"
"New Race"
"Trash"
"Ana's Song (Open Fire) (Acoustic Remix)"
"Madman"
"Blind"
"Punk Song #2"
"Wasted/Fix Me"
"Minor Threat"
"Freak (Remix For Us Rejects)"

There is also a version of the CD that contains the DVD of the best of with all the official Silverchair's videos.
Silverchair's cover of "Surfin' Bird" appeared as a bonus track exclusively on the Special Limited Edition French version.

DVD
The Best of Volume 1 - Complete Videology is both the last VHS and the first DVD made by Silverchair.
It was issued by Sony without the authorization of the band, after the split of the band from the label. The complete videology chronicles Silverchair's videos over the years 1994 - 1999 from the Frogstomp, Freak Show and Neon Ballroom albums.
The videology shows the evolution of the band, along with some live performances filmed during the 1999 "Neon Ballroom Tour".

Contents

VHS/DVD version track list
 "Emotion Sickness"
 "Miss You Love"
 "Ana's Song (Open Fire)"
 "Anthem for the Year 2000"
 "Cemetery"
 "Abuse Me"
 "Freak"
 "Israel's Son"
 "Pure Massacre" (Australian version)
 "Tomorrow"
 "The Door" - Live at Melbourne Park
 "Paint Pastel Princess" - Live at Melbourne Park
 "Spawn Again" - Live at Melbourne Park
 "Pure Massacre" (U.S. version)

 The DVD also contains the remastered version of Emotion Pictures.

DVD+CD version track listing
 Opening titles
 "Emotion Sickness"
 "Miss You Love"
 "Ana's Song (Open Fire)"
 "Anthem for the Year 2000"
 "Cemetery"
 "Abuse Me"
 "Freak"
 "Israel's Son"
 "Pure Massacre"
 "Tomorrow" (U.S. version)
 "The Door" (Channel V)
 "Paint Pastel Princess" (Channel V)
 "Spawn Again" (Channel V)
 "Pure Massacre" (Channel V)
 "Anthem for the Year 2000" (snippet)
 "Emotion Sickness" (snippet)
 "Satin Sheets" (snippet)
 "Miss You Love" (snippet)
 "Ana's Song (Open Fire)" (snippet)
 On tour video footage
 Closing credits

The track on the DVD that is called "On Tour Video Footage" is the previously released Emotion Pictures.

Personnel
Daniel Johns – vocals, guitars
Ben Gillies – drums, percussion
Chris Joannou – bass guitar

Additional personnel
Paul Mac – keyboards
Jim Moginie – keyboards

Charts

Weekly charts

Year-end charts

Certifications

References

Albums produced by Nick Launay
Silverchair video albums
2000 greatest hits albums
B-side compilation albums
Music video compilation albums
Silverchair albums